Kosoturikha is a rural locality (a village) in Kultayevskoye Rural Settlement, Permsky District, Perm Krai, Russia. The population was 270 as of 2010. There are 36 streets.

Geography 
Kosoturikha is located 29 km southwest of Perm (the district's administrative centre) by road. Protasy is the nearest rural locality.

References 

Rural localities in Permsky District